Robert Sydens Doak (March 16, 1881 – July 1, 1942) was an American football, basketball, and baseball coach. His stops included Elon University, Duke University, and Guilford College. Doak also served as Elon's and Guilford's athletic director during his tenures at the school. He was succeeded by his brother, Chick Doak, as Duke's head basketball coach in 1916.

Head coaching record

Basketball

References

External links
 

1881 births
1942 deaths
American men's basketball players
Duke Blue Devils men's basketball coaches
Elon Phoenix athletic directors
Elon Phoenix baseball coaches
Elon Phoenix men's basketball coaches
Guilford Quakers athletic directors
Guilford Quakers baseball coaches
Guilford Quakers baseball players
Guilford Quakers football coaches
Guilford Quakers men's basketball players